The Manchester South by-election was a Parliamentary by-election held on 5 March 1912. The constituency returned one Member of Parliament (MP) to the House of Commons of the United Kingdom, elected by the first past the post voting system.

Vacancy
The Liberal MP for Manchester South, Sir Arthur Haworth  was appointed a Lord Commissioner of the Treasury. In keeping with the times he was required to seek re-election in a by-election.

Electoral history
Haworth had gained the seat from the Conservatives at the 1906 general election, and held it since. The previous General Election in December 1910 saw Haworth returned unopposed. The last contested election was the previous General Election;

Candidates
The Liberal candidate, 47-year-old Arthur Haworth was a Manchester businessman fully established in the community. Haworth again faced just one opponent, the Conservative Philip Glazebrook. Thirty-two-year-old Glazebrook was a Captain in the Cheshire Yeomanry and also involved in business in Manchester. He had not stood for parliament before, though in December 1910 he was chosen as Conservative candidate to contest the constituency of Manchester South at the general election. However, due to an error by his election agent, he arrived at Manchester Town Hall six minutes after nominations had closed, resulting in the unopposed election of Haworth.

Campaign
Polling day was set for 5 March. A vigorous campaign was held, with the main issues being woman suffrage with the Parliamentary Franchise (Women) Bill soon to be debated, Irish Home Rule (the Third Home Rule Bill was currently being debated in parliament) and National Insurance, which had been introduced by the Liberal Government the year before.

Result
The Conservatives gained the seat from the Liberals. The details below, with percentage changes are a change from January 1910.

Aftermath
In parliament, Glazebrook recorded his vote against the Parliamentary Franchise (Women) Bill. 
A General Election was due to take place by the end of 1915. By the autumn of 1914, the following candidates had been adopted to contest that election. Unionist Party: Philip Glazebrook, Liberal Party: Sir Arthur Haworth. Due to the outbreak of war, the election never took place. In early 1918 Philip Glazebrook was killed in action. Unionist, Robert Burdon Stoker was returned unopposed in the following by-election. At the 1918 general election, Haworth was Liberal candidate for Manchester Exchange but failed to make a return to parliament.

References

 Who's Who: www.ukwhoswho.com
 Debrett's House of Commons 1916

South
1912 elections in the United Kingdom
1912 in England
Ministerial by-elections to the Parliament of the United Kingdom
March 1912 events
1910s in Manchester